Hastings Racecourse is a horse-racing facility at Hastings Park, four miles from downtown Vancouver. Originally called East Park, it opened for business in 1889, making it Vancouver's longest continuously used professional sports facility. The racing operation is currently a wholly owned subsidiary of the Great Canadian Gaming Corporation, which acquired the lease of the city-owned track in 2004.

History
The track was originally known as Exhibition Park Race Track, but has always been referred to by the public and the media as Exhibition Park. July 1, 1939 marked the first time thoroughbred racing used an electric starting gate, the invention of Texan Clay Puett.

Following Canada's declaration of war on Imperial Japan in 1942, Hastings Racecourse was used to house and process Japanese Canadians before being sent to internment camps in the interior of British Columbia.

On the first Monday in August, a public holiday, the track hosts BC Cup Day that features a series of six races for top Thoroughbreds in various classes. In September, the two most important races for three-year-olds in British Columbia, the British Columbia Oaks and the British Columbia Derby, are run at Hastings Racecourse.

On May 18, 2011, the course was reported to be closed at the end of its 2012 lease due to low profits from wagering revenue and slots, as well as difficulty reaching an agreeable new lease with the city. A decision by Great Canadian had to be made by October 31 of that year. The result of those negotiations was that the track remained open and running.

In 2012, Hastings Racecourse made international headlines when little-known Mexican-born jockey Mario Gutierrez (who had emigrated to Canada in 2006 and begun riding at Hastings, winning the track's riding titles in 2007 and 2008), won the Santa Anita Derby, the Kentucky Derby, and the Preakness Stakes aboard I'll Have Another.

Graded events
 
These Grade III events were held at Hastings Racecourse in 2019:
British Columbia Derby
Ballerina Stakes
BC Premier's Handicap

References

External links
 Hastings Racecourse at the NTRA
 Exhibition Park/Hastings Racecourse at the City of Vancouver 

Horse racing venues in Canada
Casinos in British Columbia
Sports venues in Vancouver
1889 establishments in British Columbia
Hastings Park
Sports venues completed in 1889